The English Civil War is a board wargame that was published by Philmar in 1978.

Description
The English Civil War is a strategic level wargame simulating the English Civil War, designed by Roger Sandell and Hartley Patterson.

The game differs from most wargames of the time in its distribution of units. In this game, each player must allocate troops to the left wing, centre and right wing. The combat between the cavalry troops in the wings (left versus right, right versus left) are resolved first. If any cavalry units are left, they can then be sent to help in the centre.

The game components are:
  49 cm by 61 cm mounted map 
 thin coverstock counters for military units
 20-page rulebook (The last two pages are removed and used as tactical combat displays)

Reviews
In the July 1979 edition of Dragon (Issue #27), Tim Kask found the cover art on the box to be "the most wretched piece of artwork I have ever seen on a game box." He was also not a fan of the game counters, finding that they "leave much to be desired, not in their printing, nor even in their coloring." However, Kask found the actual game to be "simple, it has some interesting innovations, plays well, play fairly quickly [...] and has some interesting objectives and mode of play." He concluded with a thumbs up, saying, "I would recommend the game highly to anyone interested in either this period of history or in [...] an interesting area movement game — fast moving, fun to play and easy to pick up."

Reviewer David Cox was ambivalent about the game, saying, "English Civil War is not the worst game that I have played. Nor is it the ugliest game that I have played. It is probably a reasonable simulation of the war." He found the use of a lot of dice created "a loss of control by the players and luck will play a big role." He concluded that this game would probably be "a must-have item" for English Civil War buffs, but warned others that "If you are looking for an exciting and easy game to play you probably should avoid this one. If you see it cheap in a garage sale by all means purchase it. Then give it to a friend and play it when you go and visit him."

In the 1977 book The Comprehensive Guide to Board Wargaming, game critic Charles Vasey called the game "rather long but quite accurate, with a very good tactical module."

Reviews
Games & Puzzles #74

References

Board games introduced in 1978
Board wargames set in Modern history
Wargames introduced in 1978